The 1999 Vaahteraliiga season was the 20th season of the highest level of American football in Finland. The regular season took place between June 5 and August 15, 1999. The Finnish champion was determined in the playoffs and at the championship game Vaahteramalja XX, in which the Helsinki Roosters won the Turku Trojans.

The Lappeenranta Rajaritarit forfeited just before the season, which is the reason for an unequal number of games in the regular season.

Standings

Playoffs

References 

American football in Finland
Vaahteraliiga
Vaahteraliiga